Guy Lambton Menzies (20 August 19091 November 1940) was an Australian aviator who flew the first solo trans-Tasman flight, from Sydney, Australia to the West Coast of New Zealand, on 7 January 1931.

Family

The eldest of the five children of the medical practitioner Guy Dixon Menzies (1873–1947), and Ida Mabel Menzies , née Lambton (1881–1975), Guy Lambton Menzies was born at Drummoyne, New South Wales on 20 August 1909.

Siblings
His younger brother, Ian Lambton Menzies (1912–1941), who served in the RAAF, died on 18 April 1941 in an aircraft accident near Ravenswood, Queensland, and about 100 km miles south of Townsville.

Guy's other three siblings were: Betty Lambton Menzies (1915–1980), later Mrs. William A. Horsley, medical practitioner Bruce Lambton Menzies (1917–2021), and Kathleen Audrey Lambton Menzies (born 1921), later Mrs. Joseph S. Henderson.

Marriage
He married Mrs. Marcia Ina Grundy (born 1909), née Leslie, in London, on 12 April 1940.

The fact that the Sydney press announcement of his impending marriage identified his future wife as one "Mrs. Marcia Ina Grundy" is highly significant. Connolly (2017b) reveals that the 'true story' behind the "mysterious injuries" that Menzies sustained while serving at North Weald and reported in the 1936 press, were that — rather than receiving 'head injuries' from a  fall from a window — the most significant of the injuries that he had sustained (which were "not wholly consistent with a fall") were two broken kneecaps, of such severity that it was thought for some considerable time that he would never be able to fly again. The injuries that Menzies sustained had been inflicted upon Menzies by, or on behalf of, "one of his fellow officers", Squadron-Leader E.M.F. Grundy (26046), later Air Marshal Sir Edouard Grundy, the "aggrieved husband" of Marcia, with whom Menzies was having an affair. This fact, according to Connolly, explains why the details of the secret, internal, R.A.F. enquiries were never released to the public. According to Connolly, Marcia eventually divorced her husband, who had left England at some time before her marriage to Menzies, which took place some four years after Menzies had been assaulted.

Marcia, and her son Frederick Michael (born 1934), moved to Australia in 1946. Michael went on to join the RAAF.

Education
He was educated at the academically selective Fort Street High School in Sydney.

Speedway
While still a teenager, Menzies was a well-performed dirt-track, concrete track, and speedway motorcycle rider who raced under the assumed name of Don McKay, and was billed as "The Flying Scotchman".   A number of other Australian speedway riders, such as Dave Brewster, Ern Buck, Vic Huxley, Bill Kilminster, Charlie Spinks, and Lionel Van Praag also held pilot's licenses.

First solo trans-Tasman flight
The first crossing of the Tasman by air had been achieved on 10–11 September 1928 by Charles Kingsford Smith and Charles Ulm in the Southern Cross.

Pilot's license
Menzies had gained his pilot's license in 1929, and had flying experience.

Southern Cross Junior
The plane Menzies used for his solo crossing was the Avro Sports Avian that Smith had flown from England to Australia, the Southern Cross Junior.

Blenheim
Fearing he might be denied permission for the flight, Menzies informed the authorities and his family that he was flying to Perth. Instead, he left Sydney at 1 AM on 7 January 1931, and headed for Blenheim, New Zealand.

Hari Hari
Poor weather forced Menzies off course, and after 11 hours and 45 minutes, with the high tides in the area removing any possibility of him making a safe emergency landing on a sandy beach, he crash-landed (at 3:12PM local time) upside-down in the La Fontaine Swamp near Hari Hari on New Zealand's West Coast, which he had supposed was a meadow.
As soon as it became known that Mr Menzies was heading for New Zealand . . . Colonel Horace C. Brinsmead, at that time Controller of Civil Aviation in Australia, dispatched a message to the Director of Air Services in the Defence Department in New Zealand. He asked for word about Menzies.   "Pilot G. L. Menzies left Sydney at 1 a.m. this morning flying solo in an Avro Avian aircraft G-ABCF with destination New Zealand. This department had no prior knowledge of Menzies’s proposal. I understand he had fuel for 18 hours’ flight. Appreciate earliest advice of news of his arrival in New Zealand."The day after the successful flight Colonel Brinsmead’s New Zealand opposite number replied.   "Pilot Menzies made forced landing 20 miles south of Ross 3.12 p.m. yesterday. News of arrival and your cable arrived too late for early advice. Remarkable achievement but hope no more unheralded flights of this nature."A note on the departmental file records the time of the flight as 12 hours 47 minutes. Leslie Jillett, in his book "Wings over [sic] the Tasman" gives the time as 12 hours 12 minutes and the aviator’s mother is reported to have said that his flying time was still half an hour less than that. — The Press, Tuesday, 13 July 1954.

Despite the unfortunate landing, Menzies had broken Smith and Ulm's time by 2½ hours.

Historical marker
An extensive outdoor historical marker with photographs and descriptions is located at GPS coordinates −43.076716, 170.531477 (south latitude, east longitude). The marker is approximately half a kilometre southwest of the actual landing spot (now on private land), which is marked by a pole with wind sock that are visible from the historical marker. News clippings and additional historical details are on display in the lobby of the Hotel Hari Hari, a few kilometres away on the State Highway 6.

Royal Air Force service
He joined the Royal Air Force in 1936, and served as a RAF squadron leader during the Second World War. He was part of the crew of one of the two  Sunderlands that rescued the crew of the torpedoed Kensington Court on 18 September 1939.

Death
He and his crew were killed on 1 November 1940, when his Short Sunderland flying boat (N9020) was shot down over the Mediterranean Sea while en route from Malta to Sicily. No remains of the aircraft or crew were ever found.

Commemoration
He is commemorated at the Alamein Memorial in Egypt.

75th anniversary
On 7 January 2006, celebrations were held in Hari Hari to commemorate the 75th anniversary of Menzies' trans-Tasman voyage, and were marked by a re-enactment of the flight by adventurer Dick Smith. He landed at what was dubbed "Hari Hari International Airport".

Notes

References
 Bennett, Bruce (1983), "Hayward, Charles Wiltens Andrée (1866–1950)", Australian Dictionary of Biography, Volume 9, Melbourne University Press.
 Conolly, Pauline (2017a), "Guy Menzies: A Life Lived At Fast Forward", paulineconolly.com, 18 July 2017.
 Conolly, Pauline (2017b), "Guy Menzies: Larrikin Airman", paulineconolly.com, 21 July 2017.
 Guy Menzies riding a motorbike at a speedway, Sydney, 1920s, E.A. Crome collection of photographs on aviation, National Library of Australia.
 Jillett, Leslie (1953), Wings Across the Tasman, Sydney: Angus & Robertson.
 Swopes, Ryan R. (2019), "7 January 1931", thisdayinaviation.com.
 Wearne, Max (2005), The Life of Guy Menzies: The Forgotten Flyer, 1st Edition (1 January 2005). 
 Commemorative Roll: Squadron Leader Guy Lambton Menzies (32061), Australian War Memorial.

External links
 Account of the 75th Anniversary celebrations, Peter Clarke, NZine
 Images of Guy Menzies from 1931 (from the family album of Dr Peter Clarke)
 Guy Menzies: a rebel at heart - a story from the archives of the National Library of Australia

1909 births
1940 deaths
Military personnel from New South Wales
People educated at Fort Street High School
Australian speedway riders
Australian aviators
Royal Air Force squadron leaders
People from Sydney
Royal Air Force personnel killed in World War II
Royal Air Force pilots of World War II
1931 in New Zealand
History of the West Coast, New Zealand
Sportsmen from New South Wales
Aviators killed by being shot down